Küsnət or Kyusnet may refer to:
Küsnət, Qabala, Azerbaijan
Küsnət, Quba, Azerbaijan